In Search of a Concrete Music  (French: À la recherche d'une musique concrète), written and published in 1952, is a French language publication which forms a major part of the experimental composer and theoretician Pierre Schaeffer's collection of works written to record his own undertakings on the development of musique concrète.

The collection is discussed, among other works of Schaeffer's, in chapter two of Robert Martial's Pierre Schaeffer, des transmissions à Orphée.

In this text, some have suggested, Schaeffer imagined a computerized music studio:

Contents 

 DÉDICACE
 1ER JOURNAL, 1948–1949
 2E JOURNAL, 1950–1951
 3 EXPÉRIENCE CONCRÈTE, 1952
 4 ESQUISSE D'UN SOLFÈGE CONCRET

Notes

References 
Delalande, François. "D’une technologie à l’autre." Enjeux et initiatives. 6-10.

1952 non-fiction books
Works by Pierre Schaeffer
Music books
Musique concrète